Vladimir Baharov (born 23 January 1992) is a Bulgarian footballer who plays as a midfielder for Botev Ihtiman. Baharov also plays competitive futsal.

References

External links

Living people
1992 births
Bulgarian footballers
First Professional Football League (Bulgaria) players
Association football midfielders
PFC CSKA Sofia players
Akademik Sofia players
Neftochimic Burgas players
FC Dunav Ruse players
FC Oborishte players
FC Tsarsko Selo Sofia players
PFC Minyor Pernik players
Sportspeople from Ruse, Bulgaria